Laura Miller (born November 18, 1958) is an American journalist and politician who served as the 58th mayor of Dallas, Texas from 2002 through 2007. She decided not to run for re-election in 2007. She was the third woman to serve as mayor of Dallas.

Early life
Laura Miller was born in Baltimore, Maryland. She attended the University of Wisconsin–Madison.

Career

Journalism
Miller spent the early part of her career as a journalist working as a staff writer for The Miami Herald and The Dallas Morning News and then as a columnist for the New York Daily News and the now-defunct Dallas Times Herald. In 1991, Miller became an investigative reporter for the Dallas Observer and then a columnist for D Magazine.

Politics
In 1998, Miller was elected to the Dallas City Council representing Oak Cliff and southwest Dallas. In 2002, Miller was elected as Mayor of Dallas, replacing Ron Kirk who left the post to run for the United States Senate position vacated by retiring Texas Senator Phil Gramm.

She fought for and won approval of a strengthened smoking ban, an ordinance prohibiting discrimination on the basis of sexual orientation, a revamped public housing system, a $23 million homeless assistance center, major changes to the city's Trinity River Corridor improvement plan and a taxpayer-funded downtown redevelopment effort.

She participated in an agreement between American Airlines, the City of Fort Worth, DFW Airport and Southwest Airlines to revise the federal flight restrictions at Love Field Airport, which involved: replacing geographic limitations on Love Field service with: flight caps determined by a limitation on the number of gates allowed at Love Field, restrictions on the rights of any new air carrier to service North Texas via any airport other than DFW Airport, and banning international commercial air travel at Love Field.  The unique agreement and resulting oligopoly required an exemption from federal antitrust laws, which Miller also successfully helped obtain.

David Levey, executive vice president for Forest City Enterprises, credited Miller for reviving a $250 million deal to renovate downtown's long vacant Mercantile National Bank Building.

During her term, the Dallas Cowboys announced plans to build Cowboys Stadium and many citizens hoped it would be built in Dallas. The city and the Dallas Cowboys, however, failed to reach a deal and the stadium was built in Arlington.

She announced parade plans for the Dallas Mavericks championship in 2006, prior to the Mavericks losing four straight games and ultimately the NBA championship to the Miami Heat in six games.

Miller was succeeded in office by Republican Tom Leppert.

In May 2019. Miller made an unsuccessful run for Dallas City Council to represent District 13.

Environmental efforts
Laura Miller serves as Director of Projects, Texas, for Summit Power Group, a Seattle-based developer of wind, solar and gas-fired power plants. Summit was recently selected by the U.S. Department of Energy to receive a $350 million cost-sharing award to build the world’s first IGCC (Integrated Gasification Combined Cycle) clean-coal power plant located near Odessa, Texas. The low-emissions project, called the Texas Clean Energy Project, is projected to capture just under 3 million tons a year of carbon dioxide, which will be used for enhanced oil recovery in the West Texas Permian Basin.

Miller's other environmental accomplishments included the formation and co-leading (with former Houston mayor Bill White) of the Texas Clean Air Cities Coalition, made up of 36 cities, counties and school districts in Texas that opposed the construction of 11 coal plants (which would have used older technology) by TXU, a Dallas-based energy company. Ultimately, TXU (now called Energy Future Holdings) officially suspended its plans to build eight of the eleven plants.  As a result of these efforts, Miller won a 2008 Climate Protection Award from the Environmental Protection Agency for this nationally-recognized effort, which has been memorialized in a documentary film, produced and narrated by Robert Redford, and entitled Fighting Goliath: The Texas Coal Wars.

Personal life
Miller is married to Dallas attorney and former Texas State Representative Steven D. Wolens. They have two daughters, Alex and Lily, and a son, Max.

Miller was seen attending many popular rock concerts at the now closed Gypsy Tea Room during her tenure as mayor, notably accompanying her son Max to a sold-out Something Corporate concert.

In 1998, Miller was diagnosed with breast cancer. She underwent chemotherapy and radiation treatments which effectively eradicated the cancer.

See also
2002 Dallas mayoral special election
2003 Dallas mayoral election

References

External links
Summit Power Group, Inc website
Fighting Goliath: Texas Coal Wars
 Texas Clean Energy Project website

1958 births
American women journalists
Women mayors of places in Texas
Living people
Mayors of Dallas
Politicians from Baltimore
Dallas City Council members
Texas Democrats
University of Wisconsin–Madison alumni
Women city councillors in Texas
21st-century American women